is a Japanese former cyclist. He competed in the team pursuit event at the 1988 Summer Olympics. He later became a professional keirin cyclist with over 200 wins.

References

1967 births
Living people
Japanese male cyclists
Olympic cyclists of Japan
Cyclists at the 1988 Summer Olympics
Sportspeople from Iwate Prefecture
Keirin cyclists